Tiandong North is a railway station in Tiandong County, Baise, Guangxi, China. It was built in 2015 and opened on 11 December that year as part of the Nanning–Baise section of the Nanning–Kunming high-speed railway. It is the newer of the two railway stations in Tiandong County, the other being Tiandong railway station.

References

Railway stations in Guangxi
Railway stations in China opened in 2015
Stations on the Nanning–Kunming high-speed railway